Contrafort is a magazine based in Chişinău, Moldova. It was launched in October 1994. Contrafort promotes a modern critical spirit while focusing on the contemporary literature and culture of the Republic of Moldova.

References

External links 
  Official website
 Contrafort - 15 ani (Ce înseamnă şi ce a însemnat pentru Dumneavoastră revista „Contrafort”?)
 Romanian Cultural Institute, CONTRAFORT
 Radio Free Europe, Contrafort - o revistă emancipată, îndrăzneaţă, performantă

Magazines established in 1994
Romanian-language magazines
Literary magazines published in Moldova
Mass media in Chișinău
Monthly magazines published in Romania